Gabbie Nolen (born July 7, 1982, in La Grange, Texas) is an American country music singer/songwriter. Nolen was signed by Republic/Universal Records in November 2001 after successfully recording and releasing several independent singles, including "Wait a Minute," written by Rodney Crowell and Hank Devito. Her first single for the label, "Almost There," was released in March 2002. The song peaked at number 45 on the Billboard Hot Country Singles & Tracks chart and went to number one on the Billboard Top Country Singles Sales Chart in November 2002. Republic/Universal closed its country division in late 2002.

Singles

References

External links

American women country singers
American country singer-songwriters
Living people
Singer-songwriters from Texas
Republic Records artists
1982 births
People from La Grange, Texas
21st-century American singers
21st-century American women singers
Country musicians from Texas
Universal Records artists